Inés Martín Rodrigo (born 1983) is a Spanish writer and cultural journalist. Her novel Las formas del querer is the winner of the Premio Nadal 2022.

Early life and education 
Inés Martín Rodrigo was born in 1983, in Madrid, and grew up in a village in Extremadura. She completed a journalism degree at the Complutense University of Madrid.

Career 
Martín Rodrigo works as a journalist and since 2008 has been writing for the culture section of ABC, where she coordinates the coverage of literature.

In 2016, Martín Rodrigo published her first work of fiction Azules son las horas, a biographical work which focused on the life of Sofía Casanova. Her second novel Las formas del querer, which was published six years later, won the Premio Nadal. Martín Rodrigo's body of work also includes short stories, an anthology of interviews with women writers Una habitación compartida, as well as prologues to works by such authors as David Foster Wallace, Virginia Woolf or Carmen Laforet.

In 2019, Martín Rodrigo was chosen by the Spanish Agency for International Development Cooperation to be one of the Spanish authors promoted abroad as part of their newly launched 10 de 30 program. She served as a judge for various Spanish literary awards, including Critical Eye Awards and collaborated with Hay Festival in Segovia.

Works 

 Azules son las horas, 2016
 Una habitación compartida: conversaciones con grandes escritoras, 2020
 Giselle, 2020 (a children's book with illustrations by Raquel Aparicio)
 Las formas del querer, 2022

References 

1983 births
Living people
21st-century Spanish women writers
21st-century Spanish novelists
Writers from Madrid
Complutense University of Madrid alumni
21st-century Spanish journalists
Spanish women journalists
Spanish women literary critics
Spanish literary critics